Hannu Haarala (born 15 August 1981) is a Finnish former footballer who played as a defender.

References

Guardian Football

External links
 

1981 births
Living people
Finnish footballers
Finnish expatriate footballers
Finland youth international footballers
Finland international footballers
Finnish expatriate sportspeople in the Netherlands
Expatriate footballers in the Netherlands
Helsingin Jalkapalloklubi players
SC Heerenveen players
FC Honka players
Veikkausliiga players
Eredivisie players
Association football defenders
Footballers from Helsinki